Edward Fisher (fl. 1627–1655) was an English theological writer. He is generally considered the author of The Marrow of Modern Divinity (1645) by E. F., a work which influentially stated the doctrine of unconditional grace, and was at the centre of the later Marrow Controversy. This is a view held since Thomas Tanner's attribution of 1721, but it is contested by Alexander Gordon in the Dictionary of National Biography who considers it unlikely on internal evidence.

Life
He was the eldest son of Sir Edward Fisher, knight, of Mickleton, Gloucestershire. In 1627 he entered as a gentleman commoner at Brasenose College, Oxford, and graduated B.A. on 10 April 1630. He was noted for his knowledge of ecclesiastical history and classical languages. He was a royalist, and an upholder of the festivals of the church against the Puritans. He based the obligation of the Lord's day purely on ecclesiastical authority, declining to consider it Sabbath.

He succeeded to his father's estate in 1654, but finding it much encumbered he sold it in 1656 to Richard Graves. Getting into debt he retired to Carmarthen and taught a school, but his creditors found him, and he left for Ireland. Here he died, at what date is not known. His body was brought to London for burial. He was married, but his wife died before he did.

Works by Fisher and E. F.
The publications uncontroversially identified as his are:

'The Scriptures Harmony ... by E. F., Esq.,' &c., 1643.
'' &c., without place, 'printed in the 19th yeare of our gracious lord King Charles,' &c. (anonymous).
'The Feast of Feasts, or the Celebration of the Sacred Nativity,' &c., Oxf. 1644, (anonymous, identified as Fisher's by the Bodleian Catalogue).
The Caveat, which reckons Christmas Day and Good Friday as of equal authority with the Lord's day, was attacked by John Collinges and Giles Collier. Parts of the 'Caveat' were reprinted by the Seventh Day Baptists of America, in 'Tracts on the Sabbath,' New York, 1853.

In Tanner's edition of Anthony Wood's Athenae Oxonienses (1721), Fisher is identified with E. F., the author of the Marrow of Modern Divinity; and the identification has been accepted by Philip Bliss, John Hill Burton, and others. It is doubted by George Grub. The author of the Marrow has been described as 'an illiterate barber,' but nothing seems known of him except that in his dedication to John Warner, the lord mayor, he speaks of himself as a 'poore inhabitant' of London. The following publications, all cast into the form of dialogue, and bearing the imprimatur of puritan licensers, are ascribed to the same hand:

The Marrow of Modern Divinity . . by E. F., &c., 1645; 4th edit. 1646, has recommendatory letters by Jeremiah Burroughes, William Strong, Joshua Sprigge, and Samuel Prittie.
'A Touchstone for a Communicant ... by E. F.,' c., 1647, (Joseph Caryl's imprimatur).
'The Marrow of Modern Divinity: the Second Part ... by E. F.,' &c., 1649.
'London's Gate to the Lord's Table,' &c., 1647; the title-page is anonymous, but the signature 'E. F.' appears at the end of the dedication to Judge Henry Rolle of the pleas, and Margaret his wife.
' . . . by E. F., a Seeker of the Truth,' &c., 1650.

Notes

References

External links
Who were the Marrowmen?

 

English Calvinist and Reformed theologians
17th-century English writers
17th-century English male writers
Year of birth unknown
Year of death unknown
Alumni of Brasenose College, Oxford
17th-century Calvinist and Reformed theologians
People from Mickleton, Gloucestershire